The 2007 Qatar Telecom German Open was a women's tennis event that was played from May 5 to May 13, 2007. It was one of two Tier I events that took place on red clay in the build-up to the second Grand Slam of the year, the French Open. It was played at the Rot-Weiss Tennis Club in the German capital of Berlin. The tournaments offered a total prize fund of US$1,300,000 across all rounds.

Serbian Ana Ivanovic won the title, defeating rival Svetlana Kuznetsova in the final. The title, her second in the Tier I category and her third title overall, saw her enter the world's Top 10 for the first time, where she would remain for two years. En route to the title, two of her opponents retired due to injuries: Alona Bondarenko in the third round, who was trailing 3–6, 0–5 at deuce; and Julia Vakulenko, who was 3–4 down in the first set in the semi-finals.

Finals

Singles

 Ana Ivanovic defeated  Svetlana Kuznetsova, 3–6, 6–4, 7–6(7–4)

Doubles

 Lisa Raymond /  Samantha Stosur defeated  Tathiana Garbin /  Roberta Vinci, 6–3, 6–4

Prize money & points
Total prize money: US$1,300,000

References

External links
 Official website 
 Tournament draws

Qatar Telecom German Open
Berlin